My Bed is a work by the English artist Tracey Emin. First created in 1998, it was exhibited at the Tate Gallery in 1999 as one of the shortlisted works for the Turner Prize. It consisted of her bed with bedroom objects in a dishevelled state, and gained much media attention. Although it did not win the prize, its notoriety has persisted. It was sold at auction by Christie’s in July 2014 for £2,546,500.

Inspiration
The idea for My Bed was inspired by a sexual yet depressive phase in the artist's life when she had remained in bed for four days without eating or drinking anything but alcohol. When she looked at the vile, repulsive mess that had accumulated in her room, she suddenly realised what she had created. Emin ardently defended My Bed against critics who treated it as a farce and claimed that anyone could exhibit an unmade bed. To these claims the artist retorted, "Well, they didn't, did they? No one had ever done that before."

Reactions
The artwork generated considerable media furore, particularly over the fact that the bedsheets were stained with bodily secretions and the floor had items from the artist's room, such as condoms, underwear with menstrual blood stains, other detritus, and functional, everyday objects, including a pair of slippers. The bed was presented in the state that Emin claimed it had been after languishing in it for several days; at the time she was suffering suicidal depression brought on by relationship difficulties.

Two performance artists, Yuan Chai and Jian Jun Xi, jumped on the bed with bare torsos to improve the work, which they thought had not gone far enough. They called their performance Two Naked Men Jump into Tracey's Bed. The men also had a pillow fight on the bed for around fifteen minutes, to applause from the crowd, before being removed by security guards. The artists were detained but no further action was taken. Prior to its Tate Gallery showing, the work had appeared elsewhere, including Japan, where there were variant surroundings, including at one stage a hangman's noose hanging over the bed. This was not present when it was displayed at the Tate.

Craig Brown wrote a satirical piece about My Bed for Private Eye entitled My Turd. Emin's former boyfriend, former Stuckist artist Billy Childish, stated that he also had an old bed of hers in the shed which he would make available for £20,000.

Predecessors

Art world predecessors to Emin's personal disclosure work include artists Carolee Schneemann, Sue Williams, Karen Finley, Jo Spence, and David Wojnarowicz.

Sale history and value
My Bed was bought by Charles Saatchi for £150,000 and displayed as part of the first exhibition when the Saatchi Gallery opened its new premises at County Hall, London (which it has now vacated). Saatchi also installed the bed in a dedicated room in his own home.

When it was announced, in May 2014, that the work was to be auctioned, David Maupin, Emin's dealer in New York, described the £800,000 – £1.2 million estimate as too low. When auctioned by Christie's in July 2014, the piece was sold for a little over £2.5 million.

See also
Everyone I Have Ever Slept With 1963–1995
Sir Nicholas Serota Makes an Acquisitions Decision
Empathy and Prostitution

Notes and references

External links 
Tracey Emin talks about My Bed - TateShots
My Bed on the official Tate website: 

1998 sculptures
English contemporary works of art
Collection of the Tate galleries
Young British Artists
Beds
1998 in England
Individual pieces of furniture